The blue-winged goose (Cyanochen cyanoptera) is a waterfowl species which is endemic to Ethiopia. It is the only member of the genus Cyanochen.

Relations 

The relations of this species among the waterfowl is unresolved. It is morphologically close to shelducks, and particularly the South American sheldgeese, which have highly similar courtship displays. However, mitochondrial DNA sequence analyses of the cytochrome b and NADH dehydrogenase subunit 2 genes indicates that it might belong to a very distinct and ancient "duck" clade, together with Hartlaub's duck, another African species of uncertain affinities. The wing color pattern, a good morphological indicator of evolutionary relationships in waterfowl, is similar in these two species, and very different from any other waterfowl.

Description 
It has a small black bill and black legs. A chunky mid-sized goose. Standing bird looks fairly dull, gray and dirty white, sometimes showing blue along the edge of the wing. In flight, this species shows a pale blue forewing. Sexes are similar, but immature birds are duller. The plumage of these birds is thick and loose, furlike as an adaptation to the cold of the Ethiopian highlands.

Voice 
The blue-winged goose is a quiet species, but both sexes may give a soft whistle; it does not honk or cackle like the true geese.

Habitat 
The habitats of the blue-winged goose are primarily rivers, freshwater lakes, swamps, freshwater marshes, water storage areas, and subtropical or tropical high-altitude shrubland or grassland.

Behaviour 
It feeds by grazing, and is apparently largely nocturnal, loafing during the day. It can swim and fly well, but this terrestrial bird is reluctant to do either, and is quite approachable. It forms flocks outside the breeding season.

It breeds by mountain lakes and streams. This little-known species is believed to build a lined nest amongst grass tussocks, and to lay 6–7 eggs.

Status 
It is threatened by habitat loss, trapping for food and possibly drought. It is classified as a Near Threatened species on the IUCN Red List.

References

External links
BirdLife Species Factsheet.

blue-winged goose
blue-winged goose
Endemic birds of Ethiopia
blue-winged goose